Milan noir is a 1987 French thriller film directed by Ronald Chammah and starring Isabelle Huppert.

Cast
 Isabelle Huppert as Sarah
 Joaquim de Almeida as Tremaine
 David Warrilow as Moran
 Jean Benguigui as De Giorgi
 Hanns Zischler as Hardy
 Maria Monti as Bianca
 Georges Wod as Camellieri (as Georges Wod-Wodzicki)
 Emma Campbell as Emma
 Sasha Wuliecewitch as Zuto
 Giancarlo Garbelli as Angelo
 Francesco Firpo as Ravenne

See also
 Isabelle Huppert on screen and stage

References

External links

1987 films
1980s French-language films
1987 thriller films
French thriller films
1980s French films